The 2014 Northwestern State Demons football team represented Northwestern State University as a member of the Southland Conference during the 2014 NCAA Division I FCS football season. Led by second-year head coach Jay Thomas, the Demons compiled an overall record of 6–6 with a mark of 4–4 in conference play, placing in a three-way tie for sixth in the Southland. Northwestern State played home games at Harry Turpin Stadium in Natchitoches, Louisiana.

Schedule

Game summaries

Missouri State

In their first game of the season, the Demons lost, 34–27 to the Missouri State Bears.

@ Baylor

In their second game of the season, the Demons lost, 70–6 to the Baylor Bears.

@ Southern

In their third game of the season, the Demons won, 51–27 over the Southern Jaguars.

@ Louisiana Tech

In their fourth game of the season, the Demons won, 30–27 over the Louisiana Tech Bulldogs.

@ Southeastern Louisiana

In their fifth game of the season, the Demons lost, 30–22 to the Southeastern Louisiana Lions.

Incarnate Word

In their sixth game of the season, the Demons won, 49–12 over the Incarnate Word Cardinals.

Sam Houston State

In their seventh game of the season, the Demons won, 31–27 over the Sam Houston State Bearkats.

@ Central Arkansas

In their eighth game of the season, the Demons lost, 58–35 to the Central Arkansas Bears.

McNeese State

In their ninth game of the season, the Demons lost, 35–28 to the McNeese State Cowboys.

@ Abilene Christian

In their tenth game of the season, the Demons won, 34–10 over the Abilene Christian Wildcats.

Nicholls State

In their eleventh game of the season, the Demons won, 48–21 over the Nicholls State Colonels.

@ Stephen F. Austin

In their twelfth game of the season, the Demons lost, 27–24 to the Stephen F. Austin Lumberjacks.

References

Northwestern State
Northwestern State Demons football seasons
Northwestern State Demons football